El Torno (Santa Cruz) is a town in Bolivia. In 2010 it had an estimated population of 21,294.

References

Populated places in Santa Cruz Department (Bolivia)